Bradford Marcel Young, A.S.C (born July 6, 1977) is an American cinematographer. He is best known for his work on Selma, When They See Us, A Most Violent Year, Solo: A Star Wars Story and Arrival, which earned him a nomination for an Academy Award.

Early life and background
Young spent his early years in Louisville, Kentucky, where he attended The Brown School and Central High School. He moved to Chicago at age 15 to live with his father. He received early artistic inspiration by the works of Romare Bearden, Jacob Lawrence, and Aaron Douglas. Although he intended to study writing, he studied film at Howard University, where he was influenced by Haile Gerima. His first film project at Howard was a group project, a black and white silent film shot on a Canon Super 8. Working on set with filmmaking colleagues at Howard was his introduction to film. Prior to moving to Washington, D.C. for college, Young says "the only reason I cared about movies was how most people cared about movies. I liked watching them." As a youth, he went to the theater to see Spike Lee films with his family.

Career
Young's early feature film credits as cinematographer include Mississippi Damned (2009), Pariah (2011), Restless City (2011), Middle of Nowhere (2012), Ain't Them Bodies Saints (2013), and Mother of George (2013). He has won the Cinematography Award at the Sundance Film Festival twice. In 2011, he won for his work on Pariah. Two years later, he won for his work on both Mother of George and Ain't Them Bodies Saints. He was the cinematographer for Selma (2014), which won the BET Award for Best Movie in 2015. That same year, Young was inducted into the American Society of Cinematographers (ASC).

In January 2017, Young became the first African-American cinematographer to be nominated for an Academy Award, for his work on Arrival. His work on Arrival also earned him a Silver Frog award from Camerimage and nominations for BAFTA and American Society of Cinematographers awards.

Young was the cinematographer for Solo: A Star Wars Story (2018), about space smuggler Han Solo.

In 2019, Young re-teamed with director Ava DuVernay on the Netflix drama miniseries When They See Us, based on the 1989 Central Park jogger case, which earned critical acclaim.

In addition to his feature film work, Young has collaborated with directors Kathryn Bigelow, Derek Cianfrance, Todd Haynes, Spike Jonze, and Steve McQueen on numerous short films and commercials. He has filmed music videos for artists Beck, Common, Kamasi Washington, MGMT, and Norah Jones. Young has also collaborated with artists Elissa Blount Moorhead and Leslie Hewitt on video installations that have been displayed in fine art museums around the world.

Personal life
Young is married to Stephanie Etienne, who received special thanks in A Most Violent Year. They currently reside in Baltimore, Maryland with their two sons.

Visual style
Young prefers shooting with available light. For example, in Pariah, for a nighttime bedroom scene, he shot using only Christmas lights and an IKEA lamp with a red lampshade. Amanda Petrusich in her 2012 article on Young for The New York Times states that he "favors raw light and has a penchant for shooting into it, but said he ultimately focuses on getting out of the way."

In a 2013 article from The Washington Post about cinematographers who were trained at Howard University, Hans Charles, a frequent camera assistant for Young said that he has developed a versatile but also consistently poetic, oblique visual style.

In a 2017 article from the Courier Journal, Young is quoted as acknowledging older black cinematographers such as Ernest Dickerson (Malcolm X), Arthur Jafa (Daughters of the Dust) and Malik Sayeed (Clockers) as artists who lay a foundation for black cinematographers like himself. He told the Courier Journal that he was "trying to find that balance between making sure I am present but also being that voice in the wilderness that says 'there has been great work by African-American cinematographers and it's a shame those people who came before me and who have been my teachers were not nominated for awards.'"

He also cited his childhood memory as a key source of inspiration: "Early on, when I came upon a technical difficulty (making a film), I would think back to my memories of growing up in Louisville and what the lighting was like in those moments. I still do that to this day. I think about my grandmother's house on Greenwood Avenue and scenes during her wonderful parties. Or I envision the light in my Aunt Marie's kitchen. When I am stuck on a technical issue making a film, I access those memories and I know I am doing the right thing." Young has spoken about his affinity for nonlinear storytelling and switching between overhead and handheld camera shots.

Filmography
Film

Television

Awards and recognition
 NOMINATED - Renew Media Arts Fellowship (Rockefeller Foundation) (2008)
 25 New Faces of Independent Film by Filmmaker's Magazine (2009)
 Cinematography Award, U.S. Dramatic, Sundance Film Festival for Pariah (2011)
 Cinematography Award, U.S. Dramatic, Sundance Film Festival for Mother of George and Ain't Them Bodies Saints (2013)
 NOMINATED - Academy Award for Best Cinematography for Arrival (2016)
 NOMINATED - British Academy of Film and Television Arts Film Award for Best Cinematography for Arrival (2016)

References

External links

 

1977 births
American cinematographers
Howard University alumni
Living people
Artists from Louisville, Kentucky
African-American cinematographers
21st-century African-American people
20th-century African-American people